The 1990 United States redistricting cycle took place following the completion of the 1990 United States census. In all fifty states, various bodies re-drew state legislative and congressional districts. States that are apportioned more than one seat in the United States House of Representatives also drew new districts for that legislative body. The resulting new districts were first implemented for the 1991 and 1992 elections, which saw Democrats lose nine seats from their U.S. House majority and lose sixteen state legislative chambers but continue to retain a majority of state legislative seats nationwide throughout the decade. To date, it is the last time that Democrats held a majority of state legislative seats throughout an entire census cycle. 

The districts drawn in the 1990 redistricting cycle remained in effect until the next round of redistricting following the 2000 United States census.

Reapportionment 
The results of the 1990 census determined the number of seats that each state receives in the United States House of Representatives starting with the 1992 elections. Consequently, this affected the number of votes each state has in the Electoral College for the 1992 presidential election.

Because of population changes, twenty-one states had changes in their number of seats. Eight states gained at least one seat, and thirteen states lost at least one seat. The final result involved 19 seats being switched.

Newly created districts and eliminated districts 
The new seats were first contested in the 1992 United States House of Representatives elections.

Means of redistricting 
The method of redistricting for a majority of maps implemented was through legislative committee. Democrats were initially buoyed by the results of the 1990 election, which gave them trifecta control of key Sunbelt states, like California, Texas and Florida, which gained multiple congressional seats at the expense of Midwestern and Northeastern states.

Subsequent litigation

Racial gerrymandering 
The cycle saw a large number of lawsuits and settlements regarding racial gerrymandering: 

 Clark v. Roemer (1991)
 Chisom v. Roemer (1991)
 Houston Lawyers' Association v. Attorney General of Texas (1991)
 Presley v. Etowah County Comm'n (1992)
 Growe v. Emison (1993)
 Voinovich v. Quilter (1993)
 Shaw v. Reno (1993)
 Holder v. Hall (1994)
 Johnson v. De Grandy (1994)
 United States v. Hays (1995)
 Miller v. Johnson (1995)
 Shaw v. Hunt (1996)
 Bush v. Vera (1996)
 Lopez v. Monterey County (1996)
 Reno v. Bossier Parish School Board (1997)
 Abrams v. Johnson (1997)
 Lopez v. Monterey County (1999)
 Hunt v. Cromartie (1999)
 Reno v. Bossier Parish School Board (2000)
 Sinkfield v. Kelley (2000)

Other litigation 

 Utah v. Evans (2002)
 Branch v. Smith (2003)
 Lance v. Dennis (2006)
 Lance v. Coffman (2007)

References 

Redistricting in the United States
Electoral geography of the United States